The 2016 Delaware gubernatorial election took take place on November 8, 2016, to elect the Governor of Delaware, concurrently with the 2016 U.S. presidential election, as well as elections to the United States Senate in other states and elections to the United States House of Representatives and various state and local elections.

Incumbent Democratic Governor Jack Markell was term-limited and could not run for re-election to a third term in office. Democratic congressman John Carney defeated Republican state senator Colin Bonini in a landslide.

Democratic primary

Candidates

Nominee
 John Carney, U.S. Representative, former lieutenant governor of Delaware and candidate for governor in 2008

Deceased
 Beau Biden, former Delaware Attorney General and son of Vice President and Future President Joe Biden (died May 30, 2015)

Withdrew
 Kevin Tinsley

Declined
 Matthew Denn, Delaware Attorney General and former Lieutenant Governor of Delaware
 Thomas P. Gordon, County Executive of New Castle County
 John Kowalko, state representative
 Peter Schwartzkopf, Speaker of the Delaware House of Representatives
 Bryan Townsend, state senator (running for Delaware's at-large seat in Congress)

Polling

Republican primary

Candidates

Nominee
 Colin Bonini, state senator and nominee for State Treasurer in 2010

Eliminated in primary
 Lacey Lafferty, retired state trooper

Declined
 Greg Lavelle, state senator and Minority Whip of the Delaware Senate
 Alan Levin, director of the Delaware Economic Development Office and former president and CEO of Happy Harry's
 Michael Ramone, state representative
 Daniel Short, Minority Leader of the Delaware House of Representatives
 Ken Simpler, State Treasurer of Delaware

Polling

Results

Libertarian Party

Candidates

Declared
 Sean Louis Goward

General election

Debates
Complete video of debate, October 19, 2016 - C-SPAN

Predictions

Polling 
{| class="wikitable" style="font-size:90%;"
|- valign= bottom
! Poll source
! Date(s)administered
! Samplesize
! Margin oferror
! style="width:100px;"| JohnCarney (D)
! style="width:100px;"| ColinBonini (R)
! Other
! Undecided
|-
| SurveyMonkey
| align=center| November 1–7, 2016
| align=center| 367
| align=center| ± 4.6%
|  align=center| 56%
| align=center| 40%
| align=center| —
| align=center| 4%
|-
| SurveyMonkey
| align=center| October 31–November 6, 2016
| align=center| 383
| align=center| ± 4.6%
|  align=center| 54%
| align=center| 42%
| align=center| —
| align=center| 4%
|-
| SurveyMonkey
| align=center| October 28–November 3, 2016
| align=center| 405
| align=center| ± 4.6%
|  align=center| 56%
| align=center| 40%
| align=center| —
| align=center| 4%
|-
| SurveyMonkey
| align=center| October 27–November 2, 2016
| align=center| 397
| align=center| ± 4.6%
|  align=center| 56%
| align=center| 39%
| align=center| —
| align=center| 5%
|-
| SurveyMonkey
| align=center| October 26–November 1, 2016
| align=center| 413
| align=center| ± 4.6%
|  align=center| 58%
| align=center| 37%
| align=center| —
| align=center| 5%
|-
| SurveyMonkey
| align=center| October 25–31, 2016
| align=center| 458
| align=center| ± 4.6%
|  align=center| 60%
| align=center| 36%
| align=center| —
| align=center| 4%
|-
| University of Delaware
| align=center| September 16–28, 2016
| align=center| 900
| align=center| ± 3.8%
|  align=center| 57%
| align=center| 25%
| align=center| 7%
| align=center| 11%

Results

References

External links
Official campaign websites (Archived)
 John Carney (D) for Governor
 Colin Bonini (R) for Governor
 Lacey Lafferty (R) for Governor

2016
Delaware
Gubernatorial